Questrade is an online brokerage firm and wealth management firm based in Canada. It is Canada's largest discount broker.

Products and services
The company was created by Edward Kholodenko with three partners and launched in 1999. As of early 2020, the company was Canada's fastest growing online brokerage firm, and has $20 billion under management, as of February 2021. Questrade has expanded to include robo-advising with its Questwealth Portfolios, which invests in portfolios based on ETFs. In December 2019, Questrade applied for a banking license signalling its intent to offer banking services.

References

External links
 

Robo-advisors
Financial services companies established in 1999
Online services
Online brokerages
Investment companies of Canada
Financial services companies of Canada
Companies based in Toronto
1999 establishments in Ontario